The social phenomenon of nostalgia for the era of the Soviet Union, can include its politics, its society, its culture and cultural artifacts, its superpower status, or simply its aesthetics. Modern cultural expressions of Soviet nostalgia also emphasize the former Soviet Union's scientific and technological achievements, particularly during the Space Age, and value the Soviet past for its futuristic aspirations. An analysis by Harvard Political Review found that sociological explanations for Soviet nostalgia vary from "reminiscing about the USSR's global superpower status" to the "loss of financial and political stability" which accompanied the Soviet dissolution.

In 2004, the television channel Nostalgiya, its logo featuring stylized hammer-and-sickle imagery, was launched in Russia.

Russia has extensively relied on nostalgia for the USSR to support its war effort during the 2022 invasion of Ukraine.

Polling history
Since the dissolution of the Soviet Union, annual polling by the Levada Center has shown that over 50% of Russia's population regretted this event, with the only exception to this being in the year 2012 when support for the Soviet Union dipped below 50 percent. A 2018 poll showed that 66% of Russians regretted the fall of the Soviet Union, setting a 15-year record, and the majority of these regretting opinions came from people older than 55. In 2020, polls conducted by the Levada Center found that 75% of Russians agreed that the Soviet era was the greatest era in their country's history.

According to the New Russia Barometer (NRB) polls by the Centre for the Study of Public Policy, 50% of Russian respondents reported a positive impression of the Soviet Union in 1991. This increased to about 75% of NRB respondents in 2000, dropping slightly to 71% in 2009. Throughout the 2000s, an average of 32% of NRB respondents supported the restoration of the Soviet Union.

In 2011, a poll conducted by Pew Research Center found that 82% of Ukrainians, 61% of Russians and 56% of Lithuanians believed the standard of living had fallen since the Soviet dissolution, respectively. It also found that a further 34% of Ukrainians, 42% of Russians and 45% of Lithuanians approved of the change from the Soviet command economy to a market economy.

A poll in 2013 conducted by Gallup found that a relative majority of respondents in Armenia, Kyrgyzstan, Ukraine, Russia, Tajikistan, Moldova and Belarus agreed that the Soviet dissolution harmed rather than benefited their countries. Additionally, 33% of Georgians and 31% of Azerbaijanis also agreed with this sentiment. Only 24% of respondents in the post-Soviet states surveyed by Gallup agreed that the Soviet dissolution benefited their countries. A 2012 survey commissioned by Canrgie Endowment found that 38% of Armenians believed that their country "will always have need of a leader like [Joseph] Stalin".

In 2017, another poll conducted by Pew Research Center found that 69% of Russians, 54% of Belarusians, 70% of Moldovans and 79% of Armenians claimed that the breakup of the Soviet Union was a bad thing for their country. With the exception of Estonia, the percentage of people who agreed with the statement was higher amongst people aged 35 or over. 57% of Georgians and 58% of Russians also said that Joseph Stalin played a very/mostly positive role in history.

Polling cited by the Harvard Political Review in 2022 showed that 66% of Armenians, 61% of Kyrgyz, 56% of Tajikistanis, and 42% of Moldovans regretted the dissolution of the Soviet Union.

Sociology

According to the Levada Center's polls, the primary reasons cited for Soviet nostalgia are the advantages of the shared economic union between the Soviet republics, including perceived financial stability. This was referenced by up to 53% of respondents in 2016. At least 43% also lamented the loss of the Soviet Union's global political superpower status. About 31% cited the loss of social trust and capital. The remainder of the respondents cited a mix of reasons ranging from practical travel difficulties to a sense of national displacement. A 2019 poll found that 59% of Russians felt that the Soviet government "took care of ordinary people". When asked to name positive associations with the Soviet Union in 2020, 16% of the Levada Center's respondents pointed to "future stability and confidence", 15% said they associated it with "a good life in the country", and 11% said they associated it with personal memories from their childhood or youth. 

Levada Center sociologist Karina Pipiya observed that the economic factors played the most significant role in rising nostalgia for the Soviet Union, as opposed to loss of prestige or national identity. Pipiya also suggested a secondary factor was that a majority of Russians "regret that there used to be more social justice and that the government worked for the people and that it was better in terms of care for citizens and paternalistic expectations."

Gallup observed in its data review that "For many, life has not been easy since the Soviet Union dissolved in December 1991. Residents there have lived through wars, revolutions, coups, territorial disputes, and multiple economic collapses...Older residents...whose safety nets, such as guaranteed pensions and free healthcare, largely disappeared when the union dissolved are more likely to say the breakup harmed their countries."

In her examination of identities in post-Soviet Ukraine, historian Catherine Wanner concurs that the loss or reduction of social benefits has played a major role in Soviet nostalgia among older residents. Describing elderly female pensioners who expressed nostalgia for the Soviet era, Wanner writes:

An analysis of Soviet nostalgia in the Harvard Political Review found that the "the rapid transition from a Soviet-type planned economy to neoliberal capitalism has imposed a high financial burden on the population of these fifteen newly independent post-Soviet states. This period brought a sharp decline of living standards, a reduction in social benefits, and a rise in unemployment and poverty rates. The frustration of ordinary citizens only grew, as they witnessed the creation of an oligarchic elite that was getting richer while everyone else was becoming poorer. Under these circumstances, nostalgia for the Soviet Union is a direct consequence of people’s disappointment with their countries’ political and economic performance."

Many of the ex-Soviet republics suffered economic collapse upon the dissolution, resulting in lowered living standards, increased mortality rates, devaluation of national currencies, and rising income inequality. Chaotic neoliberal market reforms, privatization, and austerity measures urged by Western economic advisers, including Lawrence Summers, and the International Monetary Fund (IMF) were often blamed by the populace of the former Soviet states for exasperating the problem. Between 1991 and 1994, a third of Russia's population was plunged into poverty, and between 1994 and 1998 this figure increased to over half the population. Most of the Soviet state enterprises were acquired and liquidated by Russian business oligarchs as part of the privatization campaign, which rendered large segments of the ex-Soviet workforce unemployed and impoverished. Capital gains made in post-Soviet Russia during the 1990s were mostly concentrated in the hands of oligarchs who benefited from the acquisition of state assets, while the majority of the population suffered severe economic hardship.

According to Kristen Ghodsee, a researcher on post-communist Eastern Europe:

Among the working poor, Soviet nostalgia is often directly linked to the guarantee of state employment and regular salaries. The collapse of Soviet state enterprises and contraction of the public sector after the dissolution resulted in widespread unemployment. With the disappearance of the Soviet industrial complex, as much as half the working class of the former USSR lost their jobs during the 1990s. One study of rural Georgians in the early 2000s found that the vast majority yearned for a return to the security of their public sector jobs, even those that did not favor a return to the centrally planned economy. They attributed their poverty to the demise of the Soviet state, which in turn resulted in the widespread association of stability with the Soviet era and lack of confidence in the post-Soviet governments. A related study of working class Kyrgyz women in the same time frame found that most remembered the Soviet era primarily for its low levels of unemployment.

Security historian Matthew Sussex wrote the 1990s were a period of "social and economic malaise experienced across the former USSR". Upon the Soviet dissolution, "rampant inflation within many newly independent states quickly became coupled to the rise of financial oligarchs...[while] uneven transitions to democracy and the institutionalization of organized crime became the norm." Furthermore, Sussex surmised, the post-Soviet space became politically unstable and prone to armed conflict as a result of the dissolution. With the collapse of the Soviet military and security organs, a security vacuum emerged which was quickly filled by extremist political and religious factions as well as organized crime, further exasperated by tensions between the various post-Soviet states over the ownership of the defunct USSR's energy infrastructure. Sussex claimed that "during its existence the USSR enforced order upon what are today recognized as numerous ethnic, religious, and geostrategic trouble spots," and "although few observers lament the passing of the USSR, even fewer would argue that the area of its former geographical footprint is more secure today than it was under communism." In Armenia, where the dissolution was followed by the Nagorno-Karabakh conflict with neighboring Azerbaijan, Soviet nostalgia was closely tied to a longing for a return to peace and public order.

In a 2020 editorial, Russian-born American journalist Andre Vltchek suggested that Soviet nostalgia may also be closely tied to aspects of Soviet society and public life—for example, the Soviet Union had an extensive public works program, heavily subsidized public facilities and transportation, high levels of civic engagement, and support for the arts. Without state subsidies and central planning, these aspects of society disappeared or became severely diminished in the post-Soviet space. Vltchek emphasized the loss or decay of Soviet-era public amenities and cultural spaces which followed the dissolution.

Anthropologist Alexei Yurchak described modern Soviet nostalgia as "a complex post-Soviet construct" based on the "longing for the very real humane values, ethics, friendships, and creative possibilities that the reality of socialism afforded - often in spite of the state's proclaimed goals - and that were as irreducibly part of the everyday life of socialism as were the feelings of dullness and alienation." Yurchak observed that localized community bonds and social capital were much stronger during the Soviet era due to various practical realities, and theorized that this was an "undeniable constitutive part" of nostalgia as expressed by the last Soviet generation.

Cultural impact

Soviet holidays

During the 1990s, most key holidays linked to the national and ideological charter of the Soviet Union were eliminated in the former Soviet republics, with the exception of Victory Day, which commemorates the Soviet Union's victory over Nazi Germany in World War II (also known in the Soviet and Russian space as the Great Patriotic War). The commemorations of Victory Day have not changed radically in most of the post-Soviet space since 1991. Catherine Wanner asserts that Victory Day commemorations are a vehicle for Soviet nostalgia, as they "kept alive a mythology of Soviet grandeur, of solidarity among the Sovietskii narod, and of a sense of self as citizen of a superpower state". Russian Victory Day parades are organized annually in most cities, with the central military parade taking place in Moscow (just as during the Soviet times). Additionally, the recently-introduced Immortal Regiment on May 9 sees millions of Russians carry the portraits of their relatives who fought in the war. Russia also retains other Soviet holidays, such as the Defender of the Fatherland Day (February 23), International Women's Day (March 8), and International Workers' Day.

Political impact

Neo-Soviet politics

Writing in the Harvard Political Review, analysist Mihaela Esanu stated that Soviet nostalgia has contributed to a revival in neo-Soviet politics. Yearning for the Soviet past in various post-Soviet republics, Esanu argued, has contributed greatly to the rise of neo-Soviet political factions committed to increasing economic, military, and political ties with Russia, the historic center of the power in the USSR, as opposed to the West. Esanu argued that appeals to Soviet nostalgia are especially prominent with pro-Russian parties in Belarus and Moldova.

Journalist Pamela Druckerman asserts that another aspect of neo-Sovietism is support for the central role of the state in civil society, political life, and the media. Druckerman claimed that neo-Soviet policies resulted in a return to statist philosophy in the Russian government.

Communist Party of the Russian Federation

Under the present conditions in the Russian Federation, the CPRF calls for the following proposals:
Gennady Zyuganov, leader of the Communist Party of the Russian Federation, is a harsh critic of President Vladimir Putin, but states that his recipes for Russia's future are true to his Soviet roots. Zyuganov hopes to renationalise all major industries and he believes the USSR was "the most humane state in human history". On 29 November 2008, in his speech before the 13th Party Congress, Zyuganov made these remarks about the state that Russia under Putin was in:

Objectively, Russia's position remains complicated, not to say dismal. The population is dying out. Thanks to the "heroic efforts" of the Yeltsinites the country has lost 5 out of the 22 million square kilometers of its historical territory. Russia has lost half of its production capacity and has yet to reach the 1990 level of output. Our country is facing three mortal dangers: de-industrialization, de-population and mental debilitation. The ruling group has neither notable successes to boast of, nor a clear plan of action. All its activities are geared to a single goal: to stay in power at all costs. Until recently it has been able to keep in power due to the "windfall" high world prices for energy. Its social support rests on the notorious "vertical power structure" which is another way of saying intimidation and blackmail of the broad social strata and the handouts that power chips off the oil and gas pie and throws out to the population in crumbs, especially on the eve of elections.

Russo-Ukrainian War

Following the invasion, many Russian tanks were shown flying the old flag of the Soviet Union alongside the pro-war Z military symbol. American political scientist Mark Beissinger told France 24 that the purpose of using these symbols was not necessarily to do with communism, but rather a desire to re-establish "Russian domination over Ukraine", noting that the use of Soviet symbols in most post-Soviet states (with the exception of Russia and Belarus) is often seen as a provocative act.

In addition to symbolism, the Bolshevism of the Russian forces manifests itself in their toponymic policy: the occupiers everywhere "return" their Soviet names to the captured settlements and cities (as well as to those they want to capture). This is officially motivated by the desire to restore historical justice. In fact, as a rule, anti-historical names given by the Bolsheviks in the 1920s and 1930s are restored instead of either returned historical (pre-revolutionary) names or Ukrainianized names obtained as part of the company for the decommunization of the country in 2014-22. Examples: Artemivsk instead of Bakhmut, Krasny (Red) Liman instead of Liman, Volodarske instead of Nikolske, Stakhanov instead of Kadiivka, etc.

Events

In April 2022, a video of a Ukrainian woman named Anna Ivanovna greeting Ukrainian soldiers at her home near Dvorichna, whom she thought to be Russian, with a Soviet flag went viral on pro-Russian social media, and featured on Russian state-controlled media. The woman said that she and her husband had "waited, prayed for them, for Putin and all the people". The Ukrainian soldiers gave her food, but went on to mock her and trample on her Soviet flag, after which she said "my parents died for that flag in World War Two". This was used by Russian propagandists to prove that the Russian invasion had popular support, in spite of the fact that most Ukrainians – even in Russian-speaking regions – opposed the invasion. In Russia, murals, postcards, street art, billboards, chevrons and stickers depicting the woman have been created. In Russian-controlled Mariupol, a statue of her was unveiled. She has been nicknamed "Grandmother Z", and the "Grandmother with a red flag" by Russians. Sergey Kiriyenko, a senior Russian politician, referred to her as "Grandma Anya".

Anna told the Ukrayinska Pravda that she met the soldiers with a Soviet flag not out of sympathy, but because she felt the need to reconcile with them so that they would not "destroy" the village and Ukraine after her house was shelled, but now feels like a "traitor" due to the way her image has been used by Russia. According to Ukrainian journalists, Anna and her son later fled to Kharkiv after their house was being shelled by the Russians.

On May 9, 2022, Vladimir Putin utilized Victory Day festivities and military parades to further justify his cause. As his response to the ongoing conflict during Victory Day, he stated "Russia has given a preemptive response to aggression. It was forced, timely and the only correct decision." He avoided directly mentioning the war and even refrained from using the word "Ukraine" in his response to the conflict during the Victory Day parade. Putin also drew parallels between the current Ukrainian government and that of Nazi Germany, praising Russia's military, saying that present troops were "fighting for the motherland, for her future, and so that nobody forgets the lessons of World War II".

On August 26, 2022, the Soviet Victory banner was hoisted over the village Pisky, a fortified area just off Donetsk whose capture is strategic for Russia, further pushing Ukrainian forces away from Donbas.

Additionally, many of Lenin statues, which had been taken down by Ukrainian activists in the preceding years, were re-erected by Russian occupiers in Russian-controlled areas.

See also

Communist chic
Hauntology
History of communism in the Soviet Union
Joseph Stalin's cult of personality
National Bolshevism
Neo-Sovietism
Neo-Stalinism
Sovietwave, a Russian musical subgenre of synthwave
Soviet patriotism
Soviet imagery during the Russo-Ukrainian War

Communist nostalgia in Europe
Communist nostalgia
Ostalgie, in the former East Germany
PRL nostalgia, in the former Polish People's Republic
Yugo-nostalgia, in the former Socialist Federal Republic of Yugoslavia

References

Further reading
Satter, D. It Was a Long Time Ago and It Never Happened Anyway: Russia and the Communist Past. Yale University Press. New Haven, 2012. .
Boffa, G. From the USSR to Russia. History of unfinished crisis. 1964—1994
Mydans, S. 20 Years After Soviet Fall, Some Look Back Longingly. New York Times. August 18, 2011
Weir, F. Why nearly 60 percent of Russians 'deeply regret' the USSR's demise. The Christian Science Monitor. December 23, 2009.
Houslohner, A. Young Russians never knew the Soviet Union, but they hope to recapture days of its empire. Washington Post. June 10, 2014
Weir, F. Maybe the Soviets weren't so bad? Russian nostalgia for USSR on the rise. The Christian Science Monitor. January 29, 2016.
Communist nostalgia in Eastern Europe: longing for the past. openDemocracy. November 10, 2015
 Ghodsee, Kristen R. Red Hangover: Legacies of Twentieth-Century Communism. Duke University Press, 2017. .

External links

News
Blundy, A. Nostalgia for the Soviet Era Sweeps the Internet. Newsweek. July 30, 2014.
Pippenger, N. Why Are So Many Russians Nostalgic For The USSR? New Republic. August 19, 2011.
In Russia, nostalgia for Soviet Union and positive feelings about Stalin. Pew Research Center. June 29, 2017.
Russian Support for Stalin Surges to Record High, Poll Says. Bloomberg. April 16, 2019.

Internet societies
Project "Encyclopedia of our childhood", Soviet Union through the eyes of contemporaries
Museum "20th century". Recollections about the Soviet epoch
livejournal:
 – "For our Soviet Motherland!"
 – "USSR (all about the 1922—1991 epoch)"
 – "What always is nice to remember..."
 – "1922 – 1991: USSR in photos"
Soviet cards and posters
USSR in scale, a website commemorated to a private collection of Soviet technology and vehicles in the scale 1:43
In Barnaul, a store called "Sovietsky" was opened (photo)
Soviet heritage: between zoo, reservation and sanctuary (about "Soviet epoch parks") // Новая Эўропа – DELFI, 11 сентября 2013

 
Dissolution of the Soviet Union
History of Russia (1991–present)
Neo-Sovietism
Nationalism in the Soviet Union